Charles Schneider (born June 24, 1973) is an American politician of the Republican Party, who served as a member of the Iowa Senate representing the state's 22nd district. He was the President of the Iowa Senate. He acted briefly as Majority Leader between Bill Dix's resignation and Jack Whitver's assumption of office.

Schneider previously served on the city council of West Des Moines, Iowa. He was first elected to the Iowa Senate in a 2012 special election to succeed Pat Ward, who died of cancer.

References

External links

21st-century American politicians
1973 births
Creighton University alumni
Iowa city council members
Republican Party Iowa state senators
Living people
People from West Des Moines, Iowa
Presidents of the Iowa Senate
University of Iowa alumni